John R. Scott Jr. was a pastor in the A. M. E. Church, served as president of Edward Waters College, held local political offices in Jacksonville, Florida, and served as a state representatives. The Florida Archives have a photo of him. His father John R. Scott Sr. was also a leader in the A.M.E. church who served as a state representative in Florida.

He represented Duval County in the Florida House of Representatives from 1889 until 1891. He and A. Lewis were the last African Americans to serve in the Florida legislature after the Reconstruction era for 80 years.

See also
African-American officeholders during and following the Reconstruction era

References

African Methodist Episcopal Church clergy
Edward Waters College faculty
Members of the Florida House of Representatives
African-American politicians during the Reconstruction Era
19th-century American politicians
Year of birth missing
Year of death missing
People from Jacksonville, Florida